Polygonatum humile, the  dwarf Solomon's-seal, is a species of plant in the family Asparagaceae. The plant is said to possess scars on the rhizome that resemble the ancient Hebrew seal of King Solomon. This is a perennial species of the genus Polygonatum native to China, Japan, Kazakhstan, Korea, Mongolia and parts of Russia.

References

External links
Missouri Botanical Gardens Profile for Polygonatum humile (dwarf Solomon's seal)
North Carolina Extension Gardener Plant Toolbox: Polygonatum humile

humile
Flora of China
Flora of Japan
Flora of Kazakhstan
Flora of Mongolia
Flora of Russia
Plants described in 1859